Dhiggaru as a place name may refer to:
 Dhiggaru (Alif Dhaal Atoll) (Republic of Maldives)
 Dhiggaru (Meemu Atoll) (Republic of Maldives)